The Piracy Act 1850 (13 & 14 Vict c 26), sometimes called the Pirates (Head Money) Repeal Act, is an Act of the Parliament of the United Kingdom. It relates to proceedings for the condemnation of ships and other things taken from pirates and creates an offence of perjury in such proceedings.

This Act is retained for the Republic of Ireland by section 2 of, and Part 4 of Schedule 1 to, the Statute Law Revision Act 2007. This Act was repealed so far as it was part of the law of the Commonwealth or a territory of Australia by section 53 of, and Schedule 2 to, the Crimes Legislation Amendment Act 1992.

The case of The Magellan Pirates was decided under this Act.

The cost of rewards paid under this Act have been given in the Navy Estimates.

Preamble
The preamble was repealed by the Statute Law Revision Act 1891.

Section 1
Section 1 repealed 6 Geo 4 c 49 (1825) (An Act for encouraging the Capture or Destruction of Piratical Ships and Vessels). It was repealed by the Statute Law Revision Act 1875, because it was spent.

Sections 2 and 3
Sections 2 and 3 were repealed by the Statute Law Revision Act 1963.

In section 2, the words "or any of the Ships or Vessels of War of the East India Company" and "after the said First Day of June" and from "including" to "Company" were repealed by the Statute Law Revision Act 1875. In section 3, the words "said Lord Commissioners of the", occurring twice, were repealed by the Statute Law Revision Act 1891.

Sections 2 and 3 were repealed for New Zealand by section 14(1) of, and the Schedule to, the Admiralty Act 1973 (No 119).

Section 4
Section 4 was repealed by the Statute Law Revision Act 1875.

Section 5 - Condemnation of ships etc taken from pirates

The words omitted were repealed by the Statute Law Revision Act 1875 and the Statute Law Revision Act 1891.

"The admiralty courts before mentioned"

Section 2 mentioned the High Court of Admiralty of England and all courts of vice admiralty in any dominions of Her Majesty beyond the seas.

The jurisdiction of the High Court of Admiralty of England was transferred to the High Court by section 1(1) of the Administration of Justice Act 1956. The jurisdiction of the Courts of Vice-Admiralty in Her Majesty's possessions abroad was transferred to Colonial Courts of Admiralty by sections 2(3) and 17 of the Colonial Courts of Admiralty Act 1890.

Section 6 - Perjury
In England and Wales this section provides:

The words at the start were repealed by the Statute Law Revision Act 1891. The words in the second place and at the end were repealed by section 56(4) of, and Part IV of Schedule 11 to, the Courts Act 1971.

This section was repealed for Northern Ireland by the Perjury Act (Northern Ireland) 1946. This section was repealed for New Zealand by section 412(1) of, and the Fourth Schedule to, the Crimes Act 1961.

"All the punishments, pains, and penalties to which persons convicted of wilful and corrupt perjury are liable"

The penalty for perjury is now provided by section 1 of the Perjury Act 1911.

"England"

This expression includes Wales.

Section 7
This section was repealed by the Statute Law Revision Act 1875.

Schedule
The Schedule was repealed by the Statute Law Revision Act 1963.

Commencement

The Act 13 & 14 Vict c 27 (1850) was an Act of the Parliament of the United Kingdom. The Bill for the Act 13 & 14 Vict c 27 was called the Pirates (Head Money) Repeal Act Commencement Bill. The Act 13 & 14 Vict c 27 provided that the Piracy Act 1850 was to come into force on 1 June 1850 instead of 1 June 1851. 13 & 14 Vict c 27 was repealed by the Statute Law Revision Act 1875, because it was spent.

See also
Piracy Act

References
Halsbury's Statutes of England and Wales. Fourth Edition. 2008 Reissue. Volume 12(1). Page 114.
Halsbury's Statutes of England. Third Edition. 1969. Volume 8. Page 106.
Halsbury's Statutes of England. (The Complete Statutes of England). First Edition. 1929. Volume 4. Page 520. Google Books:  .
The Statutes: Third Revised Edition. HMSO. 1950. Volume 6. Page 3.
The Statutes: Second Revised Edition. HMSO. London. 1894. Volume 8. Pages xviii and 632.
Cox and Paterson (eds). The Practical Statutes of the Session 1850. John Crockford, Law Times Office. London. 1850. Page 27.
The Law Reform Commission. "Criminal Admiralty Jurisdiction and Prize".  ALRC 48. 1990. Paragraphs 8, 29, 32, 45, 90, 93 at pages 9, 23, 25, 36, 65, 66, 68.
"Piracy Act, 1850". eISB.
The Victorian Statutes: The Public and Private Acts of Victoria, Also the Acts of the Federal Council of Australasia, and a Selection of the Imperial Statutes Apparently in Force in Victoria. Robert S Brain, Government Printer. Melbourne. 1890. Volume 7 (Imperial Statutes and Acts of Federal Council). Page 92
The Public Acts of Queensland (Reprint) Classified and Annotated, 1828-1936. Volume 2. Page 1012. Google Books:  
"Piracy Act 1850 (13 and 14 Vict., c. 26.)". Selection of Imperial Acts in force in New Zealand in 1881.
"Admiralty Jurisdiction: Report of the Special Law Reform Committee on Admiralty Jurisdiction". March 1972. Pages 60 and 65.
Mayers. Admiralty Law and Practice in Canada. Carswell Company. 1916. Page 186. Internet Archive. Google Books.
A Collection of Statutes Relating to India. 1913. Volume 1. Page 251.
Dicey and Goddard. The Admiralty Statutes: Being the Public Statutes Actually in Force Relating to the Admiralty and Her Majesty's Navy from 5 & 6 Edw. VI. (A.D. 1552) to 48 & 49 Vict. (A.D. 1885) Inclusive, Arranged in Chronological Order, and Followed by an Index. Second Edition. Printed by Eyre and Spottiswoode for HMSO. London. 1886. Page 126. See also page x.

External links
The Piracy Act 1850, as amended from the National Archives.
The Piracy Act 1850, as originally enacted from the National Archives.

United Kingdom Acts of Parliament 1850
Piracy law
Piracy in the United Kingdom